Uwe Windhorst (Prof. Dr. Uwe Windhorst) is a German neuroscientist, systems scientist and cyberneticist, who was born in Bremen, Germany in 1946. Windhorst became known for his pioneer research in the use of diverse methods of correlation, spectral analysis as well as nonlinear systems analysis to describe the dynamic properties of signal transmission through small neuronal networks assessed in experimental animals.

Contributions in Neurophysiology 
Windhorst's research has revolved around the control of skeletal muscle contraction based on sensory signal arising in muscles and skin and on neuronal networks predominantly in the spinal cord and brainstem. In this wider context, one line of research strived to elucidate the dynamic signal processing of the participating neurons, such as muscle spindles, motoneurons and interneurons (particularly Renshaw cells) and their importance for oscillatory process such as tremor. Related issues were the plastic properties of such networks and their modulation by signals arising in the peripheral and central nervous system, specifically in the context of muscle fatigue. A related aspect of research concerned the origin of muscle pain and its effects on spinal neurons. In addition to experimental studies, computer modeling was used to unravel the properties of small neuronal networks, especially with respect to tremor.

Education 
Between 1968 and 1974, he studied medicine at the University of Göttingen in Germany, where he also earned his PhD and his Habilitation in Neurophysiology. He became Distinguished Professor in 1987.

List of major works 
Windhorst, U. and Schwestka, R. (1982): Interactions between motor units in modulating discharge patterns of primary muscle spindle endings. Exp. Brain Res. 45, 417 427
Christakos, C.N. and Windhorst, U. (1986): The information carried by spindle afferents on motor unit activity as revealed by spectral analysis. Brain Res. 367, 52 62
Hamm, T.M., Sasaki, S., Stuart, D.G., Windhorst, U. and Yuan, C. S. (1987): The measurement of single motor axon recurrent inhibitory post synaptic potentials in the cat. J. Physiol. 388, 631 651
Windhorst, U., Rissing, R., Meyer Lohmann, J., Laouris, Y. and Kuipers, U. (1988): Facilitation and depression in the responses of spinal Renshaw cells to random stimulation of motor axons. J. Neurophysiol. 60, 1638 1652
Laouris, Y., Windhorst, U., Rissing, R., Kuipers, U. and Meyer Lohmann, J. (1988): Time constants of facilitation and depression in Renshaw cell responses to random stimulation of motor axons. Exp. Brain Res. 72, 117 128
Laouris, Y. and Windhorst, U. (1989): The relationship between coherence and nonlinear characteristics in Renshaw cell responses to random motor axon stimulation. Neurosci. 28, 625 633
Richter, D.W., Bischoff, A., Anders, K., Bellingham, M. and Windhorst, U. (1991): Response of the medullary respiratory network of the cat to hypoxia. J. Physiol. 443, 231-256
Windhorst, U., Kirmayer, D., Soibelman, F., Misri, A. and Rose, R. (1997): Effects of neurochemically excited group III-IV muscle afferents on motoneuron afterhyperpolarization. Neurosci. 76, 915-929
Roatta, S., Windhorst, U., Ljubisavljevic, M., Johansson, H., Passatore, M. (2002) Sympathetic modulation of muscle spindle afferent sensitivity to stretch in rabbit jaw closing muscles. J. Physiol. 540.1: 237-248
Kalezic, I., Bugaychenko, L.A., Kostyukov, A.I., Pilyavskii, A.I., Ljubisavljevic, M., Windhorst, U., and Johansson, H. (2003) Fatigue-related depression of the feline monosynaptic gastrocnemius-soleus reflex. J. Physiol. (Lond) 556:283-296
Pilyavskii, A.I., Maznychenko, A.V., Maisky, V.A., Kostyukov, A.I., Hellström, F., and Windhorst, U. (2005) Capsaicin-induced effects on c-fos expression and NADPH-diaphorase activity in the feline spinal cord. Eur. J. Pharmacol. 521:70-78
Kostyukov, A.I., Bugaychenko, L.A., Kalezic, I., Pilyavskii, A.I., Windhorst, U., and Djupsjöbacka, M. (2005) Effects in feline gastrocnemius-soleus motoneurones induced by muscle fatigue. Exp. Brain Res. 163:284-294
Vieira, T.M., Windhorst, U., and Merletti, R. (2010) Is the stabilization of quiet upright stance in humans driven by synchronized modulations of the activity of medial and lateral gastrocnemius muscles? J Appl Physiol 108:85-97

Reviews 
Windhorst, U., Hamm, T.M. and Stuart, D.G. (1989): On the function of muscle and reflex partitioning. Beh. Brain Sci. 12, 629 645
Windhorst, U. (1996): The spinal cord and its brain: representations and models. To what extent do forebrain mechanisms appear at brainstem and spinal cord levels? Prog. Neurobiol. 49, 381-414
Windhorst, U. (1996): On the role of recurrent inhibitory feedback in motor control. Prog. Neurobiol. 49, 517-587
Windhorst, U. (2007) Muscle proprioceptive feedback and spinal networks. Brain Res. Bull. 73:155-202

Books written and edited 
Windhorst, U. (1988): How brain like is the spinal cord? Interacting cell assemblies in the nervous system. Springer Verlag; Berlin, Heidelberg, New York, London, Paris, Tokyo
Greger, R. and Windhorst U. (eds.) (1996) Comprehensive human physiology. From cellular mechanisms to integration. Springer-Verlag; Berlin, Heidelberg
Windhorst, U. and Johansson, H. (eds.) Modern techniques in neuroscience research. Springer-Verlag; Berlin, Heidelberg 1999
Johansson, H., Windhorst, U., Djupsjöbacka, M., and Passatore, M. (eds.) Chronic work-related myalgia. Neuromuscular mechanisms behind work-related chronic muscle pain syndromes. Gävle University Press, Gävle (Sweden) 2003
Binder MD, Hirokawa N, Windhorst U (eds) Encyclopedia of neuroscience. Springer-Verlag; Berlin Heidelberg 2009

References

External links 
 Uwe Windhorst in Biomed Experts
 Books and Encyclopedias in neuroscience authored by Uwe Windhorst

1946 births
Living people
German neuroscientists
Systems scientists
Cyberneticists
Scientists from Bremen
University of Göttingen alumni